The 1864 United States presidential election in Rhode Island took place on November 8, 1864, as part of the 1864 United States presidential election. Voters chose four representatives, or electors to the Electoral College, who voted for president and vice president.

Rhode Island voted for the National Union candidate, Abraham Lincoln, over the Democratic candidate, George B. McClellan. Lincoln won the state by a margin of 24.48%.

Results

See also
 United States presidential elections in Rhode Island

References

Rhode Island
1864
1864 Rhode Island elections